Clarno may refer to:

Locations
Clarno, Oregon
Clarno, Wisconsin
Clarno (community), Wisconsin
Clarno Township, Lake County, South Dakota

Other
 Clarno Formation, an Eocene geologic formation in Central Oregon
 Beverly Clarno,  politician in the U.S. state of Oregon